Ian Kirkland Hart FRCP (14 February 1958 – 10 November 2008) was a lecturer and consultant in neurology at the Walton Centre in Liverpool. He ran a clinic for neurological paraneoplastic syndromes, myasthenia gravis, neuromyotonia, Lambert–Eaton myasthenic syndrome and autoimmune encephalitis. He was also the founder member of the Walton Centre Clinical Neuroimmunology Group researching on autoantibody-associated neurological diseases.

Hart was born in Cathcart, Glasgow, and obtained degrees from the University of Glasgow and the University of London. He was senior lecturer in neurology at the University of Liverpool.

Bibliography

References

British neurologists
1958 births
2008 deaths
Academics of the University of Liverpool
Fellows of the Royal College of Physicians
Alumni of the University of Glasgow
Alumni of the University of London
People from Cathcart